Heidi Westphal (born 5 July 1959) is a German rower and Olympic medalist. She won the silver medal in Double sculls with her partner Cornelia Linse in the 1980 Moscow Olympic Games. Westphal was born in Gnoien, Bezirk Neubrandenburg.

References

External links
 

1959 births
Living people
People from Rostock (district)
People from Bezirk Neubrandenburg
East German female rowers
Sportspeople from Mecklenburg-Western Pomerania
Olympic rowers of East Germany
Rowers at the 1980 Summer Olympics
Olympic silver medalists for East Germany
Olympic medalists in rowing
World Rowing Championships medalists for East Germany
Medalists at the 1980 Summer Olympics
Recipients of the Patriotic Order of Merit in bronze